Pien-Chien Huang (13 July 1931 – 3 August 2020) was a  Chinese-American molecular biologist.

Huang was born in Shanghai on 13 July 1931. He graduated from National Taiwan University in 1952, with a bachelor's degree in agriculture. Huang earned a master's degree at Virginia Tech in 1956, followed by a doctorate from Ohio State University in 1960. He was elected to the Academia Sinica in 1986, and taught at National Tsing Hua University in Taiwan from 1993 to 1996, concurrently serving as dean of the College of Life Sciences at NTHU. Huang taught at Johns Hopkins University's Bloomberg School of Public Health for five decades, where he was professor of biochemistry and molecular biology. Huang was also a correspondence research fellow at Academia Sinica. He was married to Ru-Chih Chow Huang from 1956 to his death in 2020.

References

1931 births
2020 deaths
American people of Chinese descent
Taiwanese people from Shanghai
Biologists from Shanghai
21st-century Taiwanese scientists
American molecular biologists
20th-century American biologists
21st-century American biologists
Taiwanese emigrants to the United States
Virginia Tech alumni
Ohio State University alumni
National Taiwan University alumni
Academic staff of the National Tsing Hua University
Members of Academia Sinica
Johns Hopkins University faculty
Chinese molecular biologists
Taiwanese university and college faculty deans
Taiwanese molecular biologists
20th-century Taiwanese scientists